Cults and Extreme Belief (also known as A&E Investigates: Cults and Extreme Belief) is an American documentary series on A&E. The show premiered on May 28, 2018, and is hosted by Elizabeth Vargas  and the first under A&E Original's A&E Investigates journalistic banner.  Each episode examines the world of fringe religions and organizations, alongside their former members.

Episodes

References

2018 American television series debuts
2018 American television series endings
2010s American documentary television series
A&E (TV network) original programming
Television series about cults